Henry Wan Noki (born 23 July 1991) is a Papua New Guinean rugby league footballer who plays  for the Papua New Guinea Hunters in the Queensland Cup. He has also represented Papua New Guinea Kumuls.

References 

1991 births
Living people
Limoux Grizzlies players
Papua New Guinea Hunters players
Papua New Guinea national rugby league team players
Papua New Guinean rugby league players
Rugby league props